Myawaddy may refer to:

 Myawaddy, town in Kayin State, Myanmar
 Myawaddy TV, Burmese TV network